Strawberry Field  is a private-use airport located two miles north of Mays Landing in Atlantic County, New Jersey in the United States. It is owned by and operated as an air attack base by the New Jersey Forest Fire Service in its wildfire suppression and aerial firefighting efforts.

See also
 Aeroflex–Andover Airport
 Coyle Field

References

External links
 New Jersey Forest Fire Service (official website)

New Jersey Forest Fire Service
Airports in New Jersey
Transportation buildings and structures in Atlantic County, New Jersey